Xie Jin (谢晋) was a Chinese film director.

Xie Jin may also refer to:

Xie Jin (painter) (謝縉, 1355–1430), Ming dynasty painter and calligrapher.
Xie Jin (mandarin) (解縉, 1369–1415), Ming dynasty mandarin, poet, erudite.
Xie Jin (actor) (謝金, born on March 5, 1982), Chinese xiangsheng actor.